Flight of Black Angel is a 1991 television thriller film directed by Jonathan Mostow for Showtime. It stars Peter Strauss and William O'Leary.

Plot
Captain Eddie Gordon (William O'Leary), a top gun pilot of an Air Force academy, is a talented and aggressive pilot who proves too much for his fellow instructees to match. His flight instructor, Lieutenant Colonel Matthew Ryan (Peter Strauss) tries to encourage him to practice restraint, but with little success.

After his birthday party at his home in Las Vegas, Eddie puts a religiously motivated long-organized plan into action: He kills his brother (Rodney Eastman) and his parents (Ben Rawnsley and K. Callan). Eddie then holds Captain Melissa Gaiter (Patricia Sill) of the Air Force base at gunpoint and forces her to arm his IAI Kfir C1 with live ordnance, a radar-jamming pod and a tactical nuclear weapon. Melissa refuses to co-operate further and is murdered.

Later, Colonel Bill Douglas (James O'Sullivan) of the base's flight control is informed of the triple murder at the Gordons' residence while a training exercise involving Eddie is under way. Eddie takes this opportunity to shoot down his fellow instructees. Ryan manages to alert the base and tries to lure Eddie into the firing range of the base's surface-to-air missiles (SAMs). Eddie however, destroys the SAMs, Ryan's plane, and the airbase runway.

Eddie lands in Garrison, Utah to hide his jet in a deserted barn, but is accidentally discovered by a family on vacation, Richard (Michael Keys Hall) and Valerie (Michele Pawk) Dwyer and their baby. Before Valerie can raise the police on the CB radio, Eddie takes them hostage.

While Eddie works on defeating the fail-safes on the tactical nuke, he is exposed to lethal radiation, and his health quickly deteriorates. The next day, he and Valerie leave for a hardware store in a nearby city to obtain tools. Valerie uses a traveler's check and writes their hostage location on the back, but the clerk (Scott Menville) does not notice. Valerie then persuades Eddie to go to a drug store to find a cure for his vomiting and nausea. She repeats the same practice; this time, the pharmacist (John D. Brancato) notices Valerie's notes on the check.

Two police officers (George Fisher and Steven D. Simpson) arrive to investigate. Eddie kills one and engages the other in a firefight. Richard and Valerie try to flee with their baby; however, Eddie shoots the second officer, Richard and Valerie. Richard dies and Valerie is seriously wounded. Painstakingly, Valerie manages to collect her baby and crawl to the roadside, where she is picked up by a truck driver.

Ryan is cross-checking police leads when the report of Valerie Dwyer comes in. She insists that she has seen Eddie working on a bomb. Just before a surgery, Ryan learns Eddie's target from Valerie: Las Vegas. Subsequently, Ryan convinces Douglas to concentrate on Las Vegas; he travels to Hill AFB to take an F-16 fighter plane to fly lead. An AWACS plane confirms what Valerie had said.

It has been determined that although Eddie cannot launch the bomb, his jet fuel could detonate the bomb if he is fired upon. Ryan successfully talks Eddie into chasing him out into the desert by provoking Eddie into a duel to see if God made him "the one". After evading Eddie's last missile, Ryan orders the other pilots to clear away, and then fires on Eddie. Both pilots and 36 people on the ground are incinerated.

A recovering Valerie receives sanitized TV news on the incident in her hospital bed with her baby in her arms. The report assert that the pilots were on a "training mission" in the area.

Release
The film was released on video in Japan on January 25, 1991, before being broadcast on Showtime on February 23, 1991. The DVD was first released in Finland on September 9, 2003. It was released under the title Flight of the Black Angel in some regions.

References

External links
Film Trailer on YouTube

Flight of Black Angel at The New York Times Online
Flight of Black Angel at Yahoo! Movies

1991 television films
1991 films
American aviation films
Films directed by Jonathan Mostow
Showtime (TV network) films
1990s English-language films
1990s American films